Hojaburjybelent Sanctuary is a sanctuary (zakaznik) of Turkmenistan.

It is part of Köýtendag Nature Reserve. It was established for the preservation and reclaiming of pistachio woods, protection of the habitat of animals.

External links
 https://web.archive.org/web/20090609072344/http://natureprotection.gov.tm/reserve_tm.html
 https://whc.unesco.org/en/tentativelists/5436/

Sanctuaries in Turkmenistan